Anel Meley Pani Thuli is an 2022 Indian Tamil-language crime drama film written and directed by R. Kaiser Anand in his debut. Produced by Vetrimaaran via Grass Root Film Company, the film stars Andrea Jeremiah and Aadhav Kannadasan. The music was composed by Santhosh Narayanan, with cinematography by Velraj, and editing by Raja Mohammad. The film was released on Sony LIV on 18 November 2022, and received mostly positive reviews from critics.

Plot 
Mathi is a brave, outspoken, woman. She has her marriage arranged with a suitable groom named Saran, and there is a happy love story. She works at a sports store as a manager. One day, a male employer and a man are stealing equipment from the store. Mathi strategically catches them and tells the employer to resign as it would be better than she sacks him and brands him as a thief. He realises his crime and begs for his job, but Mathi does not reciprocate. Also, a young female employee was getting harassed by a local goon as the two were lovers, but she does not like him now. Mathi politely tells the goon to back off and give the employee her space, but the goon still causes a stir. The customers threaten him, and he gets humiliated. This makes the female employee confident enough that she can have her marriage with someone else in Kodaikanal.

Mathi goes to Kodaikanal alone and enjoys the wedding celebrations. Afterwards, she decides to go sightseeing. On the way, her battery dies and she gets kidnapped. The next shot is her half-naked in a pitch-black forest. It is implied that she has been sexually harassed. In a dense forest at night, the whole atmosphere is dangerous; however, she somehow makes it to a clinic but does not receive proper care due to no senior doctors. Weak and anxious, she reaches the police station, where she reports her crime, and the police officer nabs the goon and the male employee. However, the culprits should be in the range of 45 to 50, but the three policemen are. It is now made clear that the three policemen are the rapists. The police initially let her go but becomes suspicious.

Just then, the senior female cop comes, and the policemen try to hide her from the senior cop, but Mathi meets the policewoman and they talk about the assault. The senior officer is enraged and assures Mathi that she will help her. However, the three policemen do not want to get caught, so they tell everyone to leave. They drag Mathi, forcibly take off her clothes, take a nude video of her, and blackmail her. They say they will release it if she reports them. The policemen chuckle, and a depressed Mathi leaves. She meets Saran, who still accepts her. She seeks treatment; however, she is still dismal. She then gets a lawyer and makes her stand.

The three men are now humiliated and try to cover their tracks by destroying the evidence of the rape, such as the condoms, but they get caught red-handed. However, they upload the nude video and alter it to make it look like the assault was with her consent. Many people disgrace Mathi. Mathi, however, is still strong. Meanwhile, Saran's family tells him that he should not marry Mathi, but he asks what wrong she did, and they are silent. The next day, Mathi goes to court and tells everything about the assault. She says that the day she left, she felt burdened and knew that she had to get the three men punished legally. She knew about the nude video but realised that her body is her weapon and not theirs, so she overcame her hurdle and decided to teach them a lesson. The judge is inspired by Mathi.

A few months later, Mathi has become famous and married Saran. She is now happier and gives lectures about rape and how to seek help. She says it was not the victim's fault so they should not be ashamed, and the victim must never feel their life is over. Everyone claps for her.

Cast 
 Andrea Jeremiah as Mathi
 Aadhav Kannadasan as Saran
 Azhagam Perumal as SI
 Anupama Kumar
 Ilavarasu
 Viji Chandrasekhar
 Lovelyn Chandrasekhar

Production 
On 9 May 2022, Dhanush unveiled the first look poster of the film starring Andrea Jeremiah. Kaiser Anand made his directorial debut with this film, produced by Vetrimaaran under Grass Root Film Company and photographed by Velraj. The title was derived from a song from Vaaranam Aayiram (2008).

Music 
The film's soundtrack was composed by Santhosh Narayanan while lyrics are written by Vivek. The first single "Mittai Mittai" released on 24 June 2022.

Release and reception 

Anel Meley Pani Thuli premiered on SonyLIV on 18 November 2022.

References

External links 
 

2020s Tamil-language films
2022 crime drama films
2022 directorial debut films
Films about rape in India
Films scored by Santhosh Narayanan
Indian crime drama films
Indian films about revenge
Indian rape and revenge films
SonyLIV original films